The International Circus Festival of Monte-Carlo is an annual circus festival that is held in Monaco every January. The festival was created in 1974 by Prince Rainier III of Monaco to recognize and promote circus performers at the pinnacle of their profession. It was initially held in Monte Carlo until the festival's permanent venue in Monaco's Fontvieille district, the Chapiteau de Fontvieille, was completed.

During the festival, circus acts from around the world are performed for paying audiences and are presented to a jury of circus professionals, specialists and journalists. The jury gives awards for the best circus acts, including the Golden Clown, Silver Clown and Bronze Clown, in the form of statuettes. Special prizes are also awarded by various companies, organizations, institutions and individuals. The awards, called , are presented during a closing gala performance attended by the Prince of Monaco and his family.

The festival is presided over by Princess Stéphanie of Monaco, who serves as the festival's president and oversees much of the planning of the competitions and gala shows. Princess Stéphanie became president of the event in 2006, succeeding her late father in the role.

Past recipients of the festival's prestigious  award have included 
Spanish clown Charlie Rivel (1974), 
American daredevil and trapeze artist Elvin Bale (1976),
Russian clown Oleg Popov (1981), 
Italian clown David Larible (1999), 
American juggler Anthony Gatto (2000), 
French circus director Alexis Grüss (1975 and 2001),
American clown Bello Nock (2011), 
Russian teeterboard act the Trushin Troupe (2017),
Hungarian animal trainers Merrylu and Jozsef Richter (2018),
and English animal trainer Martin Lacey Jr. (2010 and 2019).

References

Further reading
 Pierre Paret, Monte-Carlo ou la Renaissance du Cirque (Sorvilier, Editions de la Gardine, 1985)

External links
 Official site
 Circopedia: International Circus Festival of Monte-Carlo

Circus festivals
Theatre festivals in Monaco
Recurring events established in 1974
1974 establishments in Monaco